Tibor Tokody (born 1 September 1980 in Budapest, Hungary) is a Hungarian football player who currently plays for Győri ETO FC. He played as a forward.

External links
http://www.eto.hu

1980 births
Living people
Footballers from Budapest
Hungarian footballers
Association football forwards
Association football defenders
Hungary international footballers
Újpest FC players
Rot-Weiß Oberhausen players
Wuppertaler SV players
Győri ETO FC players
Hungarian expatriate footballers
Expatriate footballers in Germany
Hungarian expatriate sportspeople in Germany